The 1977 English cricket season was the 78th in which the County Championship had been an official competition. It was played out in the aftermath of the Kerry Packer affair. Geoffrey Boycott returned to Test cricket and managed to score his 100th career century in the Headingley Test. An Australian team that was clearly affected by Packer proved to be no match for an England side that stayed together despite the controversy. The County Championship title was shared for only the third time in history after Middlesex and Kent finished on the same points.

Honours
County Championship - Kent, Middlesex (shared title)
Gillette Cup - Middlesex
Sunday League - Leicestershire
Benson & Hedges Cup - Gloucestershire
Minor Counties Championship - Suffolk
Second XI Championship - Yorkshire II 
Wisden - Ian Botham, Mike Hendrick, Alan Jones, Ken McEwan, Bob Willis

Test series

County Championship

Gillette Cup

Benson & Hedges Cup

Sunday League

Leading batsmen

Leading bowlers

References

External sources
 CricketArchive – season and tournament itineraries

Annual reviews
 Playfair Cricket Annual 1978
 Wisden Cricketers' Almanack 1978

English cricket seasons in the 20th century
English Cricket Season, 1977
Cricket season